Get Me Some may refer to:

 "Get Me Some" (song), a 2003 song by Mercury4
 Get Me Some (album), a 2000 album by The Jeff Healey Band